Emticicia sediminis  is a bacterium from the genus of Emticicia which has been isolated from sedimenta from a shallow stream in Cheonan in Korea.

References 

Cytophagia
Bacteria described in 2015